The Battle of Ormoc Bay was a series of air-sea battles between Imperial Japan and the United States in the Camotes Sea in the Philippines from 9 November-21 December 1944, at Ormoc, part of the Battle of Leyte in the Pacific campaign of World War II. The battles resulted from Japanese operations to reinforce and resupply their forces on Leyte and U.S. attempts to interdict them.

Background
After gaining naval control over the Western Pacific in mid-1944, the Allies attacked the Philippines in October, landing troops at Leyte Gulf on the east side of Leyte on 20 October 1944. The island of Leyte was defended by about 20,000 Japanese; American General Douglas MacArthur thought that the occupation of Leyte would be only a prelude to the major engagement on Luzon. For the Japanese, maintaining control of the Philippines was essential because their loss would enable the Allies to sever their oil supply lines from Borneo and Sumatra.

The Imperial Japanese Navy responded to this attack with a combined fleet attack that led to the Battle of Leyte Gulf from 23 to 26 October. In this massive naval engagement, the Japanese Navy was destroyed as a strategic force. However, this was not at first clear, and the Japanese commander in the Philippines, General Tomoyuki Yamashita, believed that the United States Navy had suffered severe casualties and that the Allied land forces might be vulnerable. Accordingly, he began to reinforce and resupply the garrisons on Leyte; over the course of the battle the Japanese ran nine convoys to the island, landing around 34,000 troops from the 1st, 8th, 26th, 30th, and 102nd divisions. Ormoc City at the head of Ormoc Bay on the west side of Leyte was the main port on the island and the main destination of the convoys.

Decryption of messages sent using the PURPLE cipher alerted the Allies to the concentration of Japanese shipping around Leyte, but they initially interpreted this as an evacuation. However, by the first week of November the picture was clear, and the Allies began to interdict the convoys.

Operations

TA-3 and TA-4 (Japanese)
On 8–9 November, the Japanese dispatched two convoys from Manila to Ormoc Bay. The convoys were spaced one day apart so that the destroyers escorting the first convoy could double back and escort the second. However, the convoys were spotted on November 9 and attacked by land-based aircraft of the Fifth Air Force. On 10 November the 38th Bomb Group, based on Morotai, sent 32 B-25 Mitchells escorted by 37 P-47 Thunderbolts to attack TA-4 near Ponson Island. Reaching the convoy just before noon, the B-25s attacked at minimum altitude in pairs, sinking the two largest transports, Takatsu Maru and Kashii Maru, disabling a third, and sinking two of the patrol craft escorts at a cost of seven bombers, for which the group was awarded the Distinguished Unit Citation.
But the Japanese transports had been able to put ashore the 10,000 soldiers they had been carrying, be it with only a fraction of the supplies.

On 11 November, U.S. 3rd Fleet commander Admiral William F. Halsey ordered an attack by 350 planes of Task Force 38 on the combined convoys.

Rear Admiral Mikio Hayakawa went down with Shimakaze, and some 1,000 sailors from the 8 ships were killed.

TA-5 (Japanese)
Convoy TA-5 left Manila on 23 November for Port Cataingan and Port Balancan. Of the six transports, five were sunk by air attack (T-111, T-141, T-160, T-6 and T-10) .

U.S. destroyer sweeps
Bad weather in late November made air interdiction less effective, and the U.S. Navy began to send destroyers into Ormoc Bay.

An Allied patrol plane radioed a message to the division noting that a surfaced Japanese submarine (I-46) was south of Pacijan Island and heading for Ormoc Bay. The division headed south to intercept; and, at 01:27 on 28 November, Wallers radar picked up the target just off the northeast coast of Ponson Island. Waller disabled I-46 with her first shots and, unable to submerge, she could only return fire with her deck guns until she sank at 01:45.

TA-6 (Japanese)
Two transports, Shinsho Maru and Shinetsu Maru, escorted by three patrol vessels, Subchasers Nos. 45 and 53 and Patrol Boat No. 105, left Manila on 27 November. They were attacked by American PT boats in Ormoc Bay on the night of 28 November and by air attack as the survivors left the area. All five ships were sunk, but not before they were able to unload most of their badly-needed supplies to the troops on Leyte.

Another U.S. destroyer sweep on the night of 29–30 November in search of a reported convoy resulted only in the destruction of a few barges.

TA-7 (Japanese)
A convoy of three transports departed Manila on 1 December, escorted by destroyers Take and Kuwa under the command of Lieutenant Commander Masamichi Yamashita. Two groups of transport submarines also took part in the operation.

The convoy was docked at Ormoc City when it was engaged at 00:09 on 3 December by three ships of U.S. Destroyer Division 120 (DesDiv 120) under the command of Commander John C. Zahm (and ).

The U.S. ships sank the transports as they were unloading but came under heavy attack from Yokosuka P1Y "Frances" bombers, shore batteries, submarines that were known to be in the harbor, and the Japanese destroyers. Kuwa was sunk and Commander Yamashita was killed. Take attacked Cooper with torpedoes and escaped, though with some damage. Cooper sank at about 00:15 with the loss of 191 lives (168 sailors were rescued from the water on 4 December by Consolidated PBY Catalina flying boats). At 00:33, the two surviving U.S. destroyers were ordered to leave the bay, and the victorious Japanese successfully resupplied Ormoc Bay once more. This phase of the Battle of Ormoc Bay has gone down in history as the only naval engagement during the war in which the enemy brought to bear every type of weapon: naval gunnery, naval torpedoes, air attack, submarine attack, shore gunnery, and mines.

Ormoc Bay U.S. troop landings

TA-8 (Japanese)
This convoy carried 4,000 troops destined for Ormoc Bay, but which were unloaded at San Isidro, 30 miles north of Ormoc, after receiving news of the U.S. troop landings near Ormoc. All five transports, Akagisan Maru, Hakuba Maru, Shinsei Maru No. 5, Nichiyo Maru and T-7 were sunk on 7 December by air attack, and the escorting destroyers Ume and Sugi were damaged. Some 350 sailors were killed.

TA-9 (Japanese)

Aftermath
By fighting this series of engagements in Ormoc Bay, the U.S. Navy was eventually able to prevent the Japanese from further resupplying and reinforcing their troops on Leyte, contributing significantly to the victory in the land battle. The final tally of ships lost in Ormoc Bay is: U.S. – three destroyers, one high speed transport, and two LSMs; Japan – six destroyers, 20 small transports, one submarine, one patrol boat and three escort vessels.

Historian Irwin J. Kappes argued that naval historians have unjustly neglected the importance of these engagements, writing:

"In the end, it was the rather amorphous Battle of Ormoc Bay that finally brought Leyte and the entire Gulf area under firm Allied control. From 11 November 1944 until 21 December, the combined efforts of Third Fleet carrier planes, Marine fighter-bomber groups, a pincer movement by the Army’s 77th Division and the First Division plus a motley assortment of destroyers, amphibious ships and PT boats trounced the now semi-isolated Japanese in a series of skirmishes and night raids. And because of poor weather conditions air support for most of these surface actions was almost non-existent."

Fires on the Plain (novel) is a renowned book by the Japanese writer Ooka Shohei which describes the final conditions of the Japanese army on the island of Leyte and the desperate flight of some its isolated soldiers after their units have been defeated by US armed forces, as they try to reach Palompon on Leyte's West coast in the hope of re-embarking on Japanese vessels.

Notes

References

External links
Task Force 38
The TA Operations to Leyte, Part III

Conflicts in 1944
1944 in the Philippines
South West Pacific theatre of World War II
Military history of the Philippines during World War II
History of Leyte (province)
Battles of World War II involving Japan
Battles of World War II involving the United States
Ormoc
November 1944 events
December 1944 events

tl:Labanan sa Gulpo ng Leyte